2759 Idomeneus  is a dark Jupiter trojan from the Greek camp, approximately  in diameter. It was discovered on 14 April 1980, by American astronomer Edward Bowell at the Anderson Mesa Station near Flagstaff, Arizona, in the United States, and later named after Idomeneus from Greek mythology. The D-type asteroid from the Jovian background population belongs to the 80 largest Jupiter trojans. It is a suspected binary system and potentially a slow rotator with a rotation period of 479 hours.

Orbit and classification 

Idomeneus is a dark Jovian asteroid orbiting in the leading Greek camp at Jupiter's  Lagrangian point, 60° ahead of the Gas Giant's orbit in a 1:1 resonance . It is also a non-family asteroid in the Jovian background population.

It orbits the Sun at a distance of 4.8–5.5 AU once every 11 years and 10 months (4,313 days; semi-major axis of 5.19 AU). Its orbit has an eccentricity of 0.07 and an inclination of 22° with respect to the ecliptic. The body's observation arc begins with a precovery taken at Palomar Observatory in April 1954, or 26 years prior to its official discovery observation at Anderson Mesa.

Physical characteristics 

In the SDSS-based taxonomy, Idomeneus is a D-type asteroid. Pan-STARRS' survey has also characterized it as a dark D-type, while the Collaborative Asteroid Lightcurve Link (CALL) assumes it to be a C-type. Its V–I color index of 0.91, however, is typical for most larger D-type Jupiter trojans.

Rotation period 

In May 1991, a rotational lightcurve of Idomeneus was obtained from photometric observations by Stefano Mottola using the now decommissioned ESO 1-metre telescope at La Silla Observatory in Chile, with follow-up observation made in June 1992 and in November 2010. Lightcurve analysis gave a rotation period between 32.38 and 32.4 hours with a brightness amplitude between 0.22 and 0.27 magnitude.

Suspected binary and slow rotator 

In June 2016, observation by Brian Warner at the Palmer Divide Station  at the Center for Solar System Studies in California, gave an exceptionally long period  hours and an amplitude of  magnitude, which makes it a slow rotator.

The observations also indicated that Idomeneus is a binary asteroid with a minor-planet moon in its orbit. The satellite's orbital period is  hours, or alternatively,  hours with a brightness variation of 0.14 magnitude. However, the results are tentative and have not been published in any journal as of 2018.

Diameter and albedo 

According to the surveys carried out by the Japanese Akari satellite, the Infrared Astronomical Satellite IRAS, and the NEOWISE mission of NASA's Wide-field Infrared Survey Explorer, Idomeneus measures between 52.55 and 61.01 kilometers in diameter and its surface has an albedo between 0.0571 and 0.078. CALL derives an albedo of 0.0521 and a diameter of 60.95 kilometers based on an absolute magnitude of 9.9.

Naming 

This minor planet was named after the Greek hero Idomeneus, who led the Cretan armies to the Trojan War and where he slew many Trojans. The official naming citation was published by the Minor Planet Center on 20 December 1983.

Notes

References

External links 
 Asteroid Lightcurve Database (LCDB), query form (info )
 Dictionary of Minor Planet Names, Google books
 Discovery Circumstances: Numbered Minor Planets (1)-(5000) – Minor Planet Center
 
 

002759
Discoveries by Edward L. G. Bowell
Named minor planets
19800414